Mumtaz Mustafa is former Chairman Executive of Punjab Bar Council. He has been elected as Member Punjab Bar Council from Rahim Yar Khan several times. He has been Elected as Vice-Chairman of Punjab Bar Council twice. He was elected vice Chairman by Securing 44 votes of MPC's out of 75 in 2010. He is also former President of Rahim Yar Khan Bar Association. Mumtaz Mustafa also represented Government of Pakistan in National Reconciliation Ordinance (NRO) case.

Punjab Bar Council representation

Pronouncement regarding SCBA 
Addressing a press conference Mumtaz Mustafa and senior members of the Bar council said that hastening the disposing of judges was equal to the burial of justice. The judiciary should give rulings on merit without making any haste. They said not even five percent judges are honest in lower courts, whereas the remarks of Lahore High Court Chief Justice Khawaja Muhammad Sharif suggest as if judges of Khilafat-e-Rashida have been appointed. They went on to say that Punjab Bar Council is representative of more than 80,000 advocates and Qazi Anwar, the president of Supreme Court Bar Association (SCBA), is not the appropriate delegate of lawyers to decide their perspective on National Judicial Policy.

References

Advocates
Living people
Pakistani lawyers
Chairmen of the Punjab Bar Council
Year of birth missing (living people)
Vice Chairmen of the Punjab Bar Council
People from Lahore